Denver’s Art District on Santa Fe (ADSF) is a nationally known arts and cultural district, encompassing hundreds of artists, galleries, studios, theaters, and creative businesses along Santa Fe Drive in Denver, Colorado. ADSF is a 501(c)(3), nonprofit membership organization.
The organization formed in 2003 and became one of the first Certified Creative Districts in the state of Colorado in 2012.

Denver's Art District on Santa Fe spans from West 13th Avenue on the North to West Alameda Avenue on the South, and Kalamath Street on the West to Inca Street on the East. It is primarily located in the La Alma-Lincoln Park neighborhood in Denver, but it also overlaps the Baker neighborhood. This stretch of Santa Fe was once a buffalo migration route, and the first settlers arrived in the mid-1800s. The area was home to waves of immigrants, initially from Europe and Russia, followed by Mexicans fleeing the Revolution of 1910.

It is home to significant entertainment and cultural pillars such as:

 7s Management
 AEG Presents
 CHAC Gallery & Cultural Center
 Colorado Ballet
 DIME Denver
 Museo de las Americas
 Su Teatro Cultural & Performing Art Center

Hundreds of galleries, artist co-ops, and artist studios also call the Art District on Santa Fe home, including:

 Center for Visual Art, MSU Denver
 Denver Art Society
 Mai Wyn Fine Art
 Leisure Gallery
 Michael Warren Contemporary
 ReCreative Denver
 Rule Gallery
 SPACE Gallery

First Friday Art Walks are the signature event of Denver's Art District on Santa Fe. These free events occur every month, year round, and draw up to 15,000 attendees in the summer months. In 2016, the organization launched "The Art of Brunch," a free art gallery brunch crawl. In 2017, "Art on Film" was launched. The program provides free, arthouse movie screenings outdoors alongside live music and food trucks.

Westword named the Art District on Santa Fe the "Best Art District" in 2017. It also was awarded the Mayor's Award for Excellence in the Arts in 2012.

References

External links
 Denver’s Art District on Santa Fe

Geography of Denver
Culture of Denver
Tourist attractions in Denver
Arts districts
Art in Colorado